Jiří Javorský, (9 February 1932 – 16 September 2002) was a Czech tennis player. Javorský played in the Davis Cup for Czechoslovakia between 1955 and 1966. In 1957 he and his partner Věra Suková won the mixed doubles at the French Open. In 1968 Javorský moved to Germany where he became a tennis coach.

Grand Slam finals

Mixed doubles: 2 (1 title, 1 runner-up)

Honours 

French Championships: Last 32 in 1959 & 1963

Personal life 
In order to take up his coaching role in Germany, Jiří and his wife Vera moved to Heilbronn in 1968. One of their two sons was allowed by the Czech authorities to go with them but the other one, Jaroslav, was kept in Czechoslovakia as security for the family's eventual return. When he and his fiancee Anna tried to escape in 1978, they were arrested and imprisoned. The Javorskys tried through Amnesty International and others to obtain their son's release. This was achieved via a prisoner exchange in 1986, mainly through the efforts of the Campaign for the defence of the Unjustly Prosecuted (CDUP), led by Josef Josten, an exiled Czech journalist, and Lord Braine, a British politician.

References

External links
 
 

1932 births
2002 deaths
Czech male tennis players
Czechoslovak male tennis players
French Championships (tennis) champions
Tennis players from Prague
Grand Slam (tennis) champions in mixed doubles